Siege of Kalonoros (1221) was a siege that transpired during the conflict between the Sultanate of Rum and the Armenian Kingdom of Cilicia. The attack was successfully mounted by Kayqubad the Great.

Kalanoros, the name which Alanya was known during the period, was a Hellenistic city that was further expanded and fortified by the Romans and the Byzantines. This fortress became an important defense for occupying forces against regular attacks by local pirates and the Arabs. By 13th century, it was already a part of the realm of Armenian Cilicia. Because this kingdom had close relationship with the neighboring Crusader states, it became a target of Seljuk forces.

After spending the summer in Kayseri, Kayqubad the Great went on an expedition to the Alanya castle, which was under the leadership of Kir Fard. He besieged the castle in winter with his army and the navy from Antalya. After a two-month siege the castle surrendered.  It is said that the customary penalties imposed by Muslims on defeated infidels were not enforced. An agreement was signed after bouts of negotiations and this included the hand of Fard's daughter in exchange for a land grant in the form of the city of Akşehir.

On his way back to Antalya after conquering the fortress, the Sultan besieged and captured Alara, which was in the hands of Kir Fard's brother.

References

Bibliography 
Anooshahr, Ali (2008). The Ghazi Sultans and the Frontiers of Islam: A comparative study of the late medieval and early modern periods. Routledge. . Retrieved 19 August 2020.
Sümer, Farok (2002). KEYKUBAD I (in Turkish). Ankara: Published in 25th Volume of TDV İslâm Ansiklopedisi. pp. 358–359. Retrieved 7 March 2021.
G. Hill, A History of Cyprus, 4 vols., Cambridge: Cambridge University Press,1940-1952, vol. 2, pp. 74–75; C. Cahen, The Formation of Turkey, The Seljukid Sul-tanate of Rum: Eleventh to Fourteenth Century (trans. P.M. Holt), Harlow: PearsonEducation Ltd, 2001, pp. 48–49, 53 and 92-94
 
Kürkman, Garo; Diler, Omer (1981). Alaiye Paralari - Coinage of Alaiye. Istanbul: Yenilik Basimevi. pp. 130–131.

Alanya 1221
Conflicts in 1221
History of Alanya
Battles involving the Armenian Kingdom of Cilicia